McHenry is a unincorporated community located in Garrett County, Maryland, United States, on the northernmost shore of Deep Creek Lake.

Located on the outskirts of McHenry is the Garrett County Airport, Wisp Ski Resort, and Golf Club at Wisp.

McHenry is part of the media market of Pittsburgh.

McHenry's population as of 2012 was 1,328.

References

External links
Community Profile

Unincorporated communities in Garrett County, Maryland
Unincorporated communities in Maryland